Van de Stadt is a Dutch surname. Notable people with the surname include:

E. G. van de Stadt (1910–1999), Dutch yacht designer
Tim van de Stadt (born 1992), Dutch music producer

Dutch-language surnames